Glycymeris nummaria is a species of saltwater clam, a marine bivalve mollusc in the family Glycymerididae, the bittersweet clams.

Synonyms

 Arca insubrica Brocchi, 1814
 Arca nummaria Linnaeus, 1758
 Glycymeris insubrica (Brocchi, 1814)
 Glycymeris violacescens (Lamarck, 1819)
 Pectunculus cor Lamarck, 1805
 Pectunculus nudicardo Lamarck, 1819
 Pectunculus obliquatus Rayneval & Ponzi, 1854
 Pectunculus pilosellus Risso, 1826
 Pectunculus purpurascens M' Andrew, 1854
 Pectunculus reticulatus Risso, 1826
 Pectunculus transversus Lamarck, 1819
 Pectunculus zonalis Lamarck, 1819

Description

It is quite thick, almost circular in shape, with a sculpture of radiating striae and fine concentric lines. The surface is dull and may be dark or pale brown, but also whitish-yellowish. Inside of the shell is glossy, white or pale yellow, often with irregular brown markings.

Distribution and habitat
This species is widespread from Norway to the Mediterranean Sea.

References

Melita Peharda, Marija Crnčević, Ivana Bušelić, Chris A. Richardson and Daria Ezgeta-Balić - Growth And Longevity of Glycymeris nummaria (Linnaeus, 1758) from the Eastern Adriatic, Croatia

External links
 Najdek M., Ezgeta-Balić D., Blažina M., Crnčević M. & Peharda M. (2016). "Potential food sources of Glycymeris nummaria (Mollusca: Bivalvia) during the annual cycleindicated by fatty acid analysis". Scientia Marina 80(1): 123-129. .

nummaria
Molluscs described in 1758
Taxa named by Carl Linnaeus